Ulysses Samuel “Ukee” Washington III (born August 20, 1958) is an American news co-anchor for the weekday evening newscast on KYW-TV in Philadelphia, Pennsylvania.  He currently anchors CBS News Philadelphia on CBS 3 at 5,6 and 11 PM with Jessica Kartalija and CBS News Philadelphia NOW on The CW Philly at 10PM on sister station WPSG-TV, also with Kartalija.

Washington originally co-anchored the opening segment of CBS3 @ 4pm along with main anchors Natasha Brown and Alexandria Hoff until May 2020, when Brown & Hoff were inexplicably removed from their anchor positions on the broadcast. The move came as a result of layoffs that occurred due to corporate restructuring in the wake of both the December 2019 merger of Viacom and the station's parent company CBS Corporation to become ViacomCBS (now officially known as Paramount Global) and the ongoing COVID-19 pandemic, however neither Brown nor Hoff were laid off from the station. Kartalija was added to join Washington in co-anchoring the broadcast until October 2021. In that month Brown was reinstated as the sole anchor of the 4pm newscast until she would be joined by former WMAQ-TV sports anchor Siafa Lewis on November 15, 2021. Hoff left CBS3 in August 2021 after 6 years at the station and is currently a general assignment reporter for Fox News. Washington formerly anchored Eyewitness News This Morning on CBS 3 and The CW Philly with co-anchor Erika von Tiehl, as well as the hybrid news and entertainment program Talk Philly with Pat Ciarrocchi which aired weekdays at noon until it was cancelled and reverted to a regular newscast on June 29, 2015, which was anchored by von Tiehl until she left the station in March 2016. On July 1, 2015, just four days after hosting the final episode of Talk Philly, Washington was named the new co-anchor of Eyewitness News weeknight broadcasts a day after lead anchor Chris May was fired by station management along with then-Chief Meteorologist Kathy Orr & Sports Director Beasley Reece.

Washington is the son of Ulysses S. Washington, a noted professor and former football coach at Delaware State University. He is the godfather of former Philadelphia Eagles safety Nate Allen. Washington also is the second cousin of actor Denzel Washington.

Washington attended University of Richmond.

Career at KYW-TV
Prior to joining KYW-TV in 1986 as a weekend sportscaster, he was a sports anchor at WBBH-TV in Fort Myers, Florida, and at WSB-TV in Atlanta.  In 1996, he began his co-anchoring duties at KYW on morning newscasts.

In addition to his daily anchor duties, he provides viewers with "Keepin' It Reel," a special segment of the morning newscast during which he previews one of the week's theatrical releases and interviews the releases' stars and directors. Washington also hosted the local teen issues discussion show "Rap Around," which dealt with topics such as race, prom fashions, and having a brother.  In 2004, he put together a special report on the still controversial Philadelphia Experiment.

On November 11, 2011, a performance was aired on KYW-TV where Washington joined the Philadelphia Boys Choir & Chorale, of which he is a former member, and the "Facebook Volunteer Choir" at the Zion Baptist Church in north Philadelphia in singing God Bless America, in tribute to America's military veterans.  He had been asked by the Philadelphia Phillies to sing God Bless America at a seventh-inning stretch at Citizens Bank Park during the 2011 National League Championship Series, but because the Phillies had been eliminated from the playoffs in the previous round by the St. Louis Cardinals (who went on to win the 2011 World Series), he could not perform for the Phillies.  Instead, he chose to film a performance for Veterans Day.

The Broadcast Pioneers of Philadelphia inducted Washington into their Hall of Fame in 2008.

Other appearances
Washington is the second cousin of actor Denzel Washington and has had small parts in such movies as Unbreakable (2000), Signs (2002), Shooter (2007), and the 2004 remake of The Manchurian Candidate. He also appeared in The Happening (2008) portraying a television news anchor, his real life profession.  He had a minor, non-speaking part in the film Live Free or Die Hard (2007).

Television-wise, he appeared in an episode of the short-lived CBS drama series Hack and has made four appearances as a co-host of the CBS daytime show The Talk during a special week held each season where anchors from CBS stations from around the country are invited to be on the show and co-host with the show's regular panelists. Washington appeared in October 2013, July 2016, April 2019 and May 2020 (the last of which Washington did virtually from his home due to the ongoing COVID-19 pandemic).

References

1958 births
Living people
Television anchors from Philadelphia
Philadelphia television reporters
University of Richmond alumni
Journalists from Pennsylvania